Extinct or Alive is an American wildlife documentary television programme produced for Animal Planet by Hot Snakes Media of New York City, the United States. It is hosted by conservationist and television personality Forrest Galante, who travels to different locations around the globe to learn about possibly extinct animals and whether or not there is a chance that they may still be extant. The series has been involved in the possible rediscovery of eleven animals, namely the Zanzibar leopard, the Pondicherry shark, the Fernandina Island Galápagos tortoise, the Miller's grizzled langur, the Cape lion, the Malagasy hippopotamus, the Yangtze giant softshell turtle, Rio Apaporis caiman, Whitetip weasel shark, Ornate sleeper-ray and the Flapnose houndshark.

Cast 
 Forrest Galante – Host and team leader

Notable case findings 
During filming for the show in 2018, a camera trap caught apparent footage of a Zanzibar leopard on Unguja Island. The animal appeared smaller than specimens from the mainland, and seemed to have smaller, more solid spots than normally seen on African leopards. Further investigations are planned in order to confirm whether or not this is a Zanzibar leopard, and whether a viable population still exists.

During the shooting of a Shark Week special on the island of Sri Lanka, Forrest's wife Jessica discovered a pair of deceased sharks that had previously been killed by fishermen. Although one of the sharks turned out to be a bull shark, DNA testing of the second specimen suggested that it could be a Pondicherry shark, a species that hadn't been seen since 1979. Although some regional experts are confident that the shark found in the episode is a Pondicherry shark, additional molecular confirmation is needed before the shark's identity can be confirmed.

While shooting footage for Season 2 on the remote Galápagos Islands chain in February 2019, the team discovered a single female Fernandina Island Galápagos tortoise, presumed extinct since 1906. Members of the Turtle Conservancy later analyzed the findings, saying that pending genetic confirmation, the photos "almost undoubtedly" show the lost animal. The tortoise was described as being “in good health” but “underweight,” and was transported to the Fausto Llerena Tortoise Breeding Center in Isla Santa Cruz for the purpose of conservation and genetic tests. Trace evidence found on the expedition indicated that more individuals likely exist in the wild, and new searches were being planned to find a male Fernandina Tortoise that could potentially save the species. As shown by the episode in question (but contradicted on Galante's personal website) Washington Tapia-Aguilera, a biologist at the Galapagos Conservancy and director of the Giant Tortoise Restoration Initiative, was the one who actually found the single female tortoise and thus rediscovered the species.

While shooting footage for Season 2 on the island of Borneo in April and May 2019, the team caught five pieces of footage on a camera trap overlooking a mineral spring that clearly showed the Miller's grizzled langur, presumed extinct since 2011, at both day and night.

While shooting footage for Season 2 in Zimbabwe in 2019, the team collected DNA samples from an abnormally large lion that had recently been sighted in the area. Upon analyzing the DNA, the male was found to have 14% different DNA from a typical African lion, suggesting that it may have remanent genetics from the Cape lion population, which went extinct in the 1800s. The team theorizes that, through continued breeding, a pure Cape lion might one day be brought back.

While shooting footage for Season 2 in Madagascar in 2019, the team, along with primatologist and biologist Cortni Borgerson, found a non-fossilized skull and tusk that were conclusively identified as belonging to a Malagasy hippopotamus, an animal that was believed to have gone extinct 1,000 years ago. However, the skull was dated to less than 200 years old, confirming that the species survived much later than previously believed and may have even survived into the present day.

While shooting footage for Season 2 at Dong Mo Lake in Vietnam in 2019, the team, along with members of the Asian Turtle Program (ATP), captured footage of a Yangtze giant softshell turtle, a functionally extinct species with only three known surviving individuals, surfacing from the lake for a brief period. Although efforts to bring a surviving female of the species to the lake to possibly breed with the individual recorded in the episode failed due to her death in April 2019, the team hopes that their findings could contribute to a possible rescue of the species from extinction.

While shooting footage for Season 2 in Colombia, the team caught and collected confirmed DNA samples from multiple individuals, including juveniles, of the Rio Apaporis caiman, a subspecies of Spectacled caiman that had been believed to be extinct for over 30 years, suggesting that a healthy breeding population may exist in the area. In addition to the rediscovery of the animal, the DNA evidence collected shows that the Rio Apaporis caiman diverged from its closest relatives around 5 to 7 million years ago, which, when combined with several unique morphological features (blotchy yellow pattern, elongated snout, etc.), suggests that the animal is actually its own separate species of caiman instead of a subspecies. Forrest Galante is currently working on a paper to describe the Rio Apaporis caiman as its own unique species. A Colombian scientist named Sergio Balaguera-Reina had rediscovered the caiman prior to Galante's excursion and published a paper on it in 2019. Balaguera-Reina further disputes the claim that the caiman was believed to be extinct, saying, "We never thought that this caiman was extinct. But the political situation in Colombia prevented biologists from safely accessing the animal’s habitat to confirm that it’s still there." The portrayal of this finding has been questioned by related researchers as a case of "parachute science" claiming credit for previous work by in-country scientists.

While shooting footage for "Land of the Lost Sharks" in South Africa with shark expert Dave Ebert, the team caught and collected three lost shark species; the first was a Whitetip weasel shark, found on footage captured on an underwater camera trap. The Ornate sleeper-ray was found by footage captured by a South African dive master Adrian Peartan, who filmed it on a night dive, while it was feeding. Late at night Forrest and Dave managed to reel in a Flapnose houndshark, a species not seen since 1902, tag it with a GPS tracker and release it back into the ocean to study its movement patterns, revealing its very restricted range.

Possible findings
In July 2017, Forrest and his crew explore in the island of Java discovered a  cat caught on the thermal drone which may be the extinct Javan tiger, but remains yet to be confirmed.

Episodes

Season 1 (2018)

Season 2 (2019)

Specials

Reception

Criticism
Although Galante has self-claimed participation in several discoveries, he has been seen negatively by ecologists as the archetype for a "parachute scientist" where the term refers to a foreign scientist who drops into a country they don’t live in, makes use of local infrastructure, talent, and resources, then returns to write a paper, or take credit for the work of local scientists, and potentially damaging the field itself. With no discernible scientific or peer reviewed publications to his name as of 2020, and accusations of appropriation of other scientists' discoveries and rediscoveries (e.g., Rio Apaporis caiman and the Fernandina giant tortoise, of which he funded the expedition even for the accompanying scientists), Galante’s practices have also been referred as "colonial science."
It is unknown if Extinct or Alive will renew for a third season.

References

External links 
Animal Planet official website
Extinct or Alive at IMDB

2010s American documentary television series
2018 American television series debuts
Animal Planet original programming
Cryptozoological television series
Nature educational television series
Television series about mammals
Television series about reptiles and amphibians